Shajarur Kanta is a 1974 Byomkesh Bakshi film based on the novel of same name by Sharadindu Bandyopadhyay. The film was directed by actress-turned-director Manju Dey, and co-produced by Dey and Star Productions.

Cast
 Shyamal Ghosal as Byomkesh Bakshi
 Shailen Mukherjee as Ajit Kumar Banerjee
 Satindra Bhattacharya
 Pahari Sanyal
 Tarun Kumar
 Sambhu Bhattachayra
 Gita Dey
 Manju Dey

Soundtrack

See also
 Byomkesh Bakshi
 Abar Byomkesh
 Byomkesh Phire Elo
 Satyanweshi

References

External links

Bengali-language Indian films
Indian detective films
1974 crime drama films
1974 films
1970s Bengali-language films
Byomkesh Bakshi films
Films based on works by Saradindu Bandopadhyay